The Murole Canal is a transportation canal that connects the lake Palovesi with the lake Vankavesi in Ruovesi, Finland. The canal was built in 1852–1854. 

Murole Canal is a part of the route Runoilijan tie (the Poet's Route), named after the Finnish national poet Johan Ludvig Runeberg, running between the city of Tampere and the town of Virrat. The route is sailed in the summertime by the SS Tarjanne.

Dimensions 
 Length: 
 Total lift: 
The maximum dimensions allowed for a ship transiting the canal are:
 Length: 
 Beam (width): 
 Draft: 
 Height of mast:

References 

Canals in Finland
Canals opened in 1854
Kokemäenjoki basin
Ruovesi